Carex mitrata, also known as mitra sedge' is a tussock-forming species of perennial sedge in the family Cyperaceae. It is native to Japan, Korea, Taiwan and eastern parts of China.

The species was first formally described by the botanist Adrien René Franchet in 1895 as a part of the work Bulletin de la Societe Philomatique de Paris. The type specimen was collected by Urbain Faurie in 1892 from the Shidzuoka mountains in 1892.

See also
List of Carex species

References

mitrata
Taxa named by Adrien René Franchet
Plants described in 1895
Flora of Japan
Flora of Korea
Flora of China
Flora of Taiwan